The CANSA C.5 was a training biplane developed in Italy shortly before World War II.

Design and development
The C5's conventional open-cockpit, tailskid design was produced en masse in Italy under license. Originally aimed at the civil market, no sales ensued, but CANSA found a customer in the Regia Aeronautica, which placed an order for twelve aircraft in October 1939; six single-seaters and six two-seaters. This was followed by an order for fifty machines the following year. Most of the C.5s were operated by RUNA to provide basic flying training and remained in service until the Italian armistice.

Variants
 C.5 - single-seat version with Fiat A.50 engine
 C.5B - two-seat version with Fiat A.50 engine
 C.5B/1 - two-seat version with Alfa Romeo 110 engine

Specifications (C.5)

References

 
 

C.5
1930s Italian civil trainer aircraft